The Virginia Slims of Denver is a defunct WTA Tour affiliated tennis tournament played from 1972 to 1991. It was held in Denver, Colorado in the United States (in 1991: Aurora, Colorado, at a nine miles' distance from Denver) and played on indoor hard courts from 1972 to 1984 and on indoor carpet courts from 1985 to 1991.

Françoise Dürr was the most successful player at the tournament, winning the doubles competition three times, once with Australian Lesley Hunt and twice with Dutchwoman Betty Stöve.

Results

Singles

Doubles

See also
 Denver Open – men's tournament

References
 WTA Results Archive

External links

 
Hard court tennis tournaments
Carpet court tennis tournaments
Indoor tennis tournaments
Defunct tennis tournaments in the United States
Virginia Slims tennis tournaments
1972 establishments in Colorado
1991 disestablishments in Colorado
Recurring sporting events established in 1972
Recurring sporting events disestablished in 1991